Kali Puja, also known as Shyama Puja or Mahanisha Puja, is a festival originating from the Indian subcontinent, dedicated to the Hindu goddess Kali. It is celebrated on the new moon day (Dipannita Amavasya) of the Hindu calendar month of Ashwayuja (according to the amanta tradition) or Kartika (according to the purnimanta tradition). The festival is especially popular in the regions of West Bengal, Mithila, Odisha, Assam, and Tripura, as well as the town of Titwala in Maharashtra, along with the neighbouring country of Bangladesh.

History
The festival of Kali Puja is not an ancient one. Kali Puja was practically unknown before the 16th century; famous sage Krishnananda Agamavagisha first initiated Kali Puja. A late 17th-century devotional text, Kalika mangalkavya, also mentions an annual festival dedicated to Kali. In Bengal during the 18th century, King (Raja) Krishnachandra of Krishnanagar, Nadia, West Bengal also made this puja wide spread. Kali Puja gained popularity in the 19th century,  when kali saint Shri Ramkrishna became popular among the Bengalis ; wealthy landowners began patronizing the  festival on a grand scale. Along with Durga Puja, Kali Puja is the biggest festival in Tamluk, Barasat, Naihati, Barrackpore, Dhupguri, Dinhata.

Worship

During Kali Puja (like Durga Puja) worshippers honour the goddess Kali in their homes in the form of clay sculptures and in pandals (temporary shrines or open pavilions). She is worshipped at night with tantric rites and mantras. She is prescribed offerings of red hibiscus flowers, sweets, rice and lentils. It is prescribed that a worshipper should meditate throughout the night until dawn. Homes and pandals may also practice rites in the Brahmanical (mainstream Hindu-style, non-Tantric) tradition with ritual dressing of Kali in her form as Adya Shakti Kali and no animals are sacrificed. She is offered food and sweets made of rice, lentils, and fruits. However, in Tantric tradition, animals are ritually sacrificed on Kali Puja day and offered to the goddess. A celebration of Kali Puja in Kolkata, Bhubaneswar and in Guwahati is also held in a large cremation ground where she is believed to dwell. Barasat, Barrackpore, Naihati and Madhyamgram region of North 24 Parganas, In North Bengal: Dhupguri, Dinhata, Coochbehar is well known for their majestic pandals, lightings and Idols. Durga Puja of Kolkata is often said synonymously with Kali Puja of Barasat. The region experiences Lacs of footfalls during the days of the festival. People from different regions gather to witness the majestic Pandals.

The pandals also house images of Kali's consort, Shiva, two famous Bengali Kali devotees named Ramakrishna and Bamakhepa, along with scenes from mythology of Kali and her various forms, including images of the Mahavidyas, sometimes considered as the "ten Kalis." The Mahavidyas is a group of ten Tantric goddesses headed by Kali. People visit these pandals throughout the night. Kali Puja is also the time for magic shows, theater, and fireworks. Recent custom has incorporated wine consumption.

In the Kalighat Temple in Kolkata, Kalikhetra Temple in Bhubaneswar and in Kamakhya Temple in Guwahati, Kali is worshipped as Lakshmi on this day so as to reflect an essence of Vaishnava Haldars on Kali worship. Goddess Lakshmi is worshiped in her three forms, Maha Lakshmi, Maha Kali and Maha Saraswati on this day. The temple is visited by thousands of devotees who give offerings to the goddess. Another famous temple dedicated to Kali in Kolkata is Dakshineswar Kali Temple, where Sri Rāmakrishna performed rites. Khepa kali tala (Khepi Maa) in Katwa.

Other celebrations

Although the widely popular annual Kali Puja celebration, also known as the Dipanwita Kali Puja, is celebrated on the new moon day of the month of Kartika, Kali is also worshipped in other new moon days too. Three other major Kali Puja observations are Ratanti Kali Puja, Phalaharini Kali Puja and Kaushiki Kali Puja. Kaushiki Kali Puja is associated with Goddess Tara of Tarapith, while   Ratanti puja is celebrated on Magha Krishna Chaturdashi and Phalaharini puja is celebrated on Jyeshta Amavashya of Bengali calendar. The Phalaharini Kali Puja is especially important in the life of the saint Ramakrishna and his wife Sarada Devi, since on this day in 1872, Ramakrishna worshipped Sarada Devi as the goddess Shodashi. In many Bengali and Assamese households, Kali is worshipped daily.

Notes

References

Citations

Works cited

Further reading

External links
 Kali Puja celebrated in India and Bangladesh
 

Hindu festivals
Religious festivals in India
Festivals in West Bengal
Festivals in Odisha
Shaktism
October observances
November observances